Iḍāfah is the Arabic grammatical construct case, mostly used to indicate possession.

Idāfa basically entails putting one noun after another: the second noun specifies more precisely the nature of the first noun. In forms of Arabic which mark grammatical case, this second noun must be in the genitive case. The construction is typically equivalent to the English construction "(noun) of (noun)". It is a very widespread way of forming possessive constructions in Arabic, and is typical of a Semitic language. Simple examples include:
   "the house of peace".
   "a kilo of bananas".
   "the daughter of Hasan/Hasan's daughter".
   "the house of a man/a man's house".
   "the house of the man/the man's house".

Terminology

The Arabic grammatical terminology for this construction derives from the verb  ʼaḍāfa "he added, attached", verb form IV from the hollow root  ḍ y f.
 The first term in the pair is called   "the thing annexed".
 The first term governs (i.e. is modified by) the second term, referred to as   "the thing added to".

Kinds of relationship expressed

The range of relationships between the first and second elements of the idafah construction is very varied, though usually consists of some relationship of possession or belonging. In the case of words for containers, the iḍāfah may express what is contained:   "a cup of coffee". The iḍāfah may indicate the material something is made of:   "a wooden ring, ring made of wood". In many cases the two members become a fixed coined phrase, the idafah being used as the equivalent of a compound noun used in some Indo-European languages such as English. Thus   can mean "house of the (certain, known) students", but is also the normal term for "the student hostel".

Forming iḍāfah constructions

First term 
The first term in iḍāfah has the following characteristics:
 It must be in the construct state: that is, it does not have the definite article or any nunation (any final ), or any possessive pronoun suffix.
"Ahmad's aunt".
 It can be in any case: this is determined by the grammatical role of the first term in the sentence where it occurs.

Second term 
The second term in iḍāfah has the following characteristics when it is a noun:
 It must be in the genitive case.
 It is marked as definite (with the definitive article) or indefinite (with nunation, in those varieties of Arabic that use it), and can take a possessive pronoun suffix. The definiteness or indefiniteness of the second term determines the definiteness of the entire idāfa phrase.

Three or more terms 
iḍāfah constructions of multiple terms are possible, and in such cases, all but the final term are in the construct state, and all but the first member are in the genitive case. For example:   "the theft of the passport [literally "license of journey"] of one of the athletes".

Indicating definiteness in iḍāfah constructions

The iḍāfah construction as a whole is a noun phrase. It can be considered indefinite or definite only as a whole. An idafah construction is definite if the second noun is definite, by having the article or being the proper name of a place or person. The construction is indefinite if it the second noun is indefinite. Thus idafah can express senses equivalent to:
 'the house of the director'
 'the house of a director'
For example:
   (literally 'the house for/to a director').
   "Muhammad's big house, the big house of Muhammad" (idafah)
  "a big house of Muhammad's" (construction with )

Adjectives and other modifiers in iḍāfah

Nothing (except a demonstrative determiner) can appear between the two nouns in iḍāfah. If an adjective modifies the first noun, it appears at the end of the iḍāfah.

Modifying the first term

An adjective modifying the first noun appears at the end of the iḍāfah and agrees with the noun it describes in number, gender, case, and definiteness (the latter of which is determined by the last noun of the iḍāfah).

Modifying the last term 
An adjective modifying the last term appears at the end of the iḍāfah and agrees with the noun it describes in number, gender, definiteness, and case (which is always genitive).

Modifying both terms 
If both terms in the idāfa are modified, the adjective modifying the last term is set closest to the idāfa, and the adjective modifying the first term is set further away. For example:

Iḍāfah constructions using pronouns

The possessive suffix can also take the place of the second noun of an  construction, in which case it is considered definite. Indefinite possessed nouns are also expressed via a preposition.

Variant forms 
For all but the first person singular, the same forms are used regardless of the part of speech of the word attached to. The same alternation occurs in the third person dual and plural.
  "her friend"
  "her new friend"
  "a friend of hers"
  "a new friend of hers"

In the first person singular, however, the situation is more complicated;  "my" is attached to nouns. In the latter case,  is attached to nouns whose construct state ends in a long vowel or diphthong (e.g. in the sound masculine plural and the dual), while  is attached to nouns whose construct state ends in a short vowel, in which case that vowel is elided (e.g. in the sound feminine plural, as well as the singular and broken plural of most nouns). Furthermore,  of the masculine sound plural is assimilated to  before  (presumably,  of masculine defective -an plurals is similarly assimilated to ). Examples:
 From   "book", pl   (most of nouns in general).

 From   "world";   "hospital" (nouns ending on ـَا ـَى ـًى).

 From nom. dual   "teachers", acc./gen. dual   (dual nouns)

 From nom. pl.   "teachers", acc./gen. pl.   (regular plural ـُون nouns)

 From pl.   "chosen" (regular plural ـَوْن nouns)

 From   "judge" (active participle nouns ending on ـٍ as nominative)

 From   "father", long construct form   (long construct nouns)

 From any nouns ending on ـُو ,  ـَو  or ـِي  (more commonly loanwords).

 From any nouns ending on ـَي  (more commonly loanwords).

Pronominal nouns in most of Arabic dialects 

 From   "book", pl   (most of nouns in general).

 From   "word" (nouns ending on ة).

 From   "world"

 From   "father"

References

Arabic grammar
Genitive construction